Henry E. Prickett (1829 – June 14, 1885) served as mayor of Boise, Idaho Territory, for two months in 1867 and 1868. For years Prickett was believed to have been the first elected Boise mayor, but recent research has revealed that a Dr. Ephraim Smith preceded him in the office.

Prickett was declared mayor after the winner of the November 1867 mayoral election, L. B. Lindsay, was disqualified. A new mayoral election was held in January 1868, won by Thomas B. Hart.

In 1871 Prickett ran for a full one-year term as Boise mayor as a Radical Republican. He was narrowly defeated by John Hailey, who never assumed the office. According to city records incumbent mayor Charles Himrod served the ensuing term.

References
Mayors of Boise - Past and Present
Idaho State Historical Society Reference Series, Corrected List of Mayors, 1867-1996

1829 births
1885 deaths
Mayors of Boise, Idaho
19th-century American politicians